Onychium is a genus of ferns in the subfamily Pteridoideae of the family Pteridaceae.

Species
, the Checklist of Ferns and Lycophytes of the World recognized the following species and hybrids:
Onychium cryptogrammoides Christ
Onychium divaricatum (Poir.) Alston
Onychium japonicum (Thunb.) Kunze
Onychium kholianum Fraser-Jenk. & S.Matsumoto
Onychium lucidum (D.Don) Spreng.
Onychium × matsumotoi Fraser-Jenk. & Kandel
Onychium moupinense Ching
Onychium plumosum Ching
Onychium siliculosum (Desv.) C.Chr.
Onychium tenuifrons Ching
Onychium vermae Fraser-Jenk. & Khullar

References

Pteridaceae
Fern genera